The Roman Catholic Archdiocese of Rouen (Latin: Archidioecesis Rothomagensis; French: Archidiocèse de Rouen) is an archdiocese of the Latin Church of the Roman Catholic Church in France. As one of the fifteen Archbishops of France, the Archbishop of Rouen's ecclesiastical province comprises the greater part of Normandy. The Archbishop of Rouen is currently Dominique Lebrun.

History
According to legend, developed in the 11th century, the diocese was founded by Nicasius, a disciple of St. Denis who was martyred after arriving in Normandy towards the end of the first century on a mission from Pope Clement I. Most of the episcopal lists of the Diocese of Rouen, however, omit Nicasius' name. Rouen became an archdiocese probably around 744 with the accession of Grimo. Archbishop Franco baptized Rollo of Normandy in 911, and the archbishops were involved in the Norman conquest of England in 1066. Normandy was annexed to France in 1204, and Rouen was later occupied by England from 1419 to 1449 during the Hundred Years' War. In 1562 the city was briefly captured by Huguenots during the French Wars of Religion.

The suffragan dioceses of Rouen in the Middle Ages were Évreux, Avranches, Seès, Bayeux, Lisieux, and Coutances. Today its suffragans are the Diocese of Évreux, the Diocese of Bayeux and Lisieux, the Diocese of Coutances, the Diocese of Le Havre, and the Diocese of Sées.

The seat of the archbishop is the 13th century Gothic Rouen Cathedral. The Cathedral Chapter is composed of ten dignitaries (the Dean, the Precentor, the Treasurer, the Archdeacon Major, the Archdeacon Augi (Eu), the Archdeacon of Cales-Major (Grand-Caux), the Archdeacon of Velocassium Franciae (Vexin Français), the Archdeacon of Velocassium Normanniae (Vexin Normande), the Archdeacon of Cales-Minor (Petit-Caux), and the Chancellor); in addition there were forty-seven Canons (which included the offices of Succentor, Theologian and Penitentiary).

In addition to the right to nominate the Archbishop of Rouen (from the Treaty of Bologna of 1516, between Francis I and Leo X), the King of France also enjoyed the right of nomination of a considerable number of benefices in the archdiocese.  These included: twenty-four abbeys; fourteen priories; the Dean and Canons of the Church of Notre-Dame-de-la-Ronde in Rouen; and the Dean and nine prebends of the Church of Saint-Mellon-de-Pontoise.

The Cathedral was heavily damaged, along with other buildings in Rouen, during World War II and later rebuilt.  The archdiocese was the site of the terrorist attack at the church of Saint-Étienne-du-Rouvray.

Bishops

 Nicasius (c. 250)
 Mellonius (260–311)
 Avitianus (311–325)
 Severus (325–341)
 Eusebius (c. 341–366)
 Marcellinus (366–385)
 Peter I (385–393)
 Victricius (393–417)
 Innocent (417–c. 426)
 Sylvester (c. 426–442)
 Malsonus (c. 442–451)
 Germanus (c. 451–462)
 Crescentius (c. 462–488)
 Godardus (c. 488–525), Gildard, Gildardus
 Filleul (525–542)
 Evodus (542–550)
 Saint Praetextatus (550–586)
 Melantius (589–602)
 Hidulphus (602–631)
 Romanus (631–640)
 Saint Ouen (641–689)
 Ansbert (689–693)
 Grippo (695–c. 719)
 Roland (c. 719–c. 732)
 Hugh of Champagne (720–730)
 Robert I (740–744)

Archbishops

744–1000

 Grimo (744–c. 748)
 Ragenfred (748–753)
 Remigius (753–762)
 Hugh II (762–769)
 Meinhard (769–c. 800)
 Gilbert (800–828)
 Ragnoard (828–836)
 Gombaud (836–849)
 Paul (849–855)
 Wenilo (858–869)
 Adalard (869–872)
 Riculf (872–876)
 John I (876–889)
 Wito (889–c. 910)
 Franco (911–919)
 Gonthard (919–942)
 Hugh III (942–989)
 Robert II (990–1037)

1000–1400

 Mauger (1037–1055)
 Maurilius (1055–1067)
 John II (1067–1078)
 William I Bonne-Âme (1079–1110)
 Geoffrey Brito (1111–1128)
 Hugh de Boves (1129–1164)
 Rotrou (1165–1184)
 Walter de Coutances (1184–1208)
 Robert III Poulain (1208–1222)
 Thibaud d'Amiens (1222–1231)
 Maurice (1231–1237)
 Peter II de Colmieu (1237–1245)
 Eudes I Clement (1245–1247)
 Eudes II Rigaud (1247–1276)
  (1276–1306)
 Bernard de Fargis (1306–1311)
 Gilles I Aycelin de Montaigu (1311–1319)
 William III de Durfort (1319–1331)
 Peter III Roger de Beaufort (1331–1338)
 Aimery Guenaud (1338–1342)
 Nicolas I Roger (1342–1347)
 John III de Marigny (1347–1351)
 Peter IV de la Forêt (1351–1356)
 William IV de Flavacourt (1356–1369)
 Philippe of Alençon (1369–1375)
 Peter V de la Montre (1375)
 William V de Lestranges (1375–1388)
 William VI de Vienne, O.S.B. (1389–1406) (Avignon Obedience)

1400–1800

 Louis I d'Harcourt (1406–1422)
 Jean de La Roche-Taillée (1422–1430)
 Hugh V des Orges (1430–1436)
 Louis II de Luxemburg (1436–1443)
 Raoul Roussel (1443–1455)
 Guillaume d'Estouteville (1453–1482)
 Robert IV de Croixmare (1482–1494)
 Georges d'Amboise (1493–1510)
 Georges II d'Amboise (1510–1550)
 Charles, Cardinal de Bourbon (1550–1590)
 Charles II de Bourbon-Vendôme<ref>Bourbon was elected Coadjutor Archbishop of Rouen on 1 August 1583, but he never received episcopal consecration.  He was named a cardinal on 12 December 1583 at the age of 21. He died on 30 July 1594. Salvador Miranda, The Cardinals of the Holy Roman Church, Bourbon de Vendome, Charles III de, retrieved: 2017-01-05.</</ref> (1590–1594)
 Charles III de Bourbon (1594–1604)
 François de Joyeuse (1605–1614)
 François II de Harlay (1614–1651)
 François de Harlay de Champvallon (1651–1672)
 François IV Rouxel de Médavy de Grancey (1672–1691)
 Jacques-Nicolas Colbert (1691–1707)
 Claude-Maur d'Aubigné (1708–1719)
 Armand Bazin de Bezons (1719–1720)
 Louis de La Vergne-Montenard de Tressan (1724–1733)
 Nicolas II de Saulx-Tavannes (1734–1759)
 Dominique de La Rochefoucauld (1759–1800)
Jean-François Leverdier (Constitutional Bishop-elect, Metropolitan of Côtes-de-la-Manche) (1791)
Louis Charrier de la Roche (Constitutional Bishop)

1800–present

vacant after the French Revolution (1790–1802)
 Etienne-Hubert Cambacérès (1802–1818)
 François de Pierre de Bernis (1819–1823)
 Gustave Maximilien Juste de Croÿ-Solre (1823–1844)
 Louis-Marie-Edmond Blanquart de Bailleul (1844–1858)
 Henri de Bonnechose (1858–1883)
 Léon Thomas (1883–1894)
 Guillaume Sourrieu (1894–1899)
 Frédéric Fuzet (1899–1916)
 Louis-Ernest Dubois (1916–1920)
 André du Bois de La Villerabel (1920–1936)
 Pierre-André-Charles Petit de Julleville (1936–1947)
 Joseph-Marie Martin (1948–1968)
 André Pailler (1968–1981)
 Joseph Duval (1981–2004)
 Jean-Charles Descubes (2004–2015)
 Dominique Lebrun (2015–present)

See also
Roman Catholicism in France
Saint-Louis Church, Rouen

References

Bibliography

Reference works
  (Use with caution; obsolete)
  (in Latin) 
 (in Latin)

Studies

Tabbagh, Vincent (ed.) (1998): Fasti Ecclesiae Gallicanae. Répertoire prosopographique des évêques, dignitaires et chanoines des diocèses de France de 1200 à 1500. II. Diocèse de Rouen. Turnhout, Brepols.

External links
  Centre national des Archives de l'Église de France, L'Épiscopat francais depuis 1919, retrieved: 2016-12-24. 
Archbishops of Rouen 
Official website 
Archdiocese of Rouen (Catholic Encyclopedia)

Bishops of Rouen
Rouen
Rouen
Rouen